Park Soo-ae (born 16 September 1979), known mononymously as Soo Ae, is a South Korean actress best known for portraying Kim In-hae in the 2013 film The Flu and Oh Soo-yeon in the 2018 film High Society.

Soo Ae began her career on television, but after her breakout role in A Family (2004), she became well-known as a leading actress in films, notably in Sunny (2008) and Midnight FM (2010).

She also appeared in the popular television melodramas Emperor of the Sea (2004), A Thousand Days' Promise (2011), Queen of Ambition (2013) and Mask (2015). In 2016, she made her romantic-comedy drama comeback in KBS2's Sweet Stranger and Me.

Career

Pre-debut
Soo Ae nearly became a member of a K-pop idol group. Fresh out of high school, a record agent approached the young stunner on the street in the trendy Apgujeong area. She spent six months in grueling practice, but in the end had no album to put out. She reminisced in an interview, "I didn't sing well, but the six months I spent with the team was so fun. I was lucky to get into acting."

2002–2008
Soo Ae made her small screen debut in 2002 in a one-act drama on MBC, then went on to star in Love Letter, Merry Go Round, and April Kiss. She rose to fame after starring in 2004 hit historical drama Emperor of the Sea, which was exported to other Asian countries, South America and the Middle East, introducing Soo Ae to a wider international audience.

With her classical beauty and innocent, elegant image, Soo Ae gained the moniker "queen of tears" for her well-received takes in melodramas. But she revamped that image in the 2007 romantic comedy Two Outs in the Ninth Inning opposite Lee Jung-jin, playing a 30-year-old foul-mouthed, disheveled and jaded single woman struggling with life and love. Soo Ae in reality was known for her a husky, neutral voice, which helped her tomboyish performance feel so natural. But her voice wasn't always a plus. She said, "I've been told many times that my voice would be a detriment to my career. When I first got started, a lot of viewers posted comments online that they changed the channel because of the way I talk. [...] It was odd because I thought of my husky voice as my biggest asset. So I would tell people, "Keep on listening, you'll get to like it."

After a successful big screen debut in A Family, Soo Ae starred opposite Jung Jae-young in the comedy Wedding Campaign, and Lee Byung-hun in the melodrama Once in a Summer.

In 2008, she was cast as the titular Sunny in a film about an ordinary housewife who becomes a "consolatory band" singer in order to search for her husband who has been dispatched to fight alongside American troops in the Vietnam War. Director Lee Joon-ik sought to tell a war story from a female-centric point of view, saying the film deals with the meaning of love and humanitarian as it depicts a long voyage of self-discovery. In a scene where she drinks heavily at a U.S. army base, Soo Ae revealed that she drank more than half a bottle of whisky at the director's criticism that she didn't look convincing enough. As a result of drinking so much alcohol, she became really drunk, adding reality to the scene where she throws up in the toilet and blacks out. Her commitment to the film paid off, and Soo Ae received multiple Best Actress awards for her performance.

2009–2012
Her 2009 film The Sword with No Name depicted a desperate romance between the last queen of the Joseon Dynasty and her bodyguard. Empress Myeongseong, a forward-thinking advocate of modernity, wields her political influence to further her ideals, but is often at odds with her orthodox father-in-law, regent Daewon-gun. The movie is loosely based on history, with clearly fictional elements. Soo Ae said the role "was something I had always wanted to do from the moment I started my acting career. When I got the screenplay, I said yes without a moment's hesitation. [...] Playing Empress Myeongseong was not easy, because in addition to the mother of the nation, I had to show her womanly and human side, the joy and anguish she felt at being in love." Having to wear heavy wigs and layers of Korean traditional costumes in the steamy hot summer made the job even more difficult. The fact that she had to appear in almost every scene was another challenge. Describing herself as "timid" and "too introverted," Soo Ae credits her co-star Cho Seung-woo for making it easier for her to fully absorb herself in the love aspect of her role, such that it felt "like [they] were actually in a relationship during the shoot."

Frustrated by usually receiving melodrama scripts and wanting to take on roles in different genres, Soo Ae next starred in the 2010 suspense thriller Midnight FM. She said she decided to challenge herself by choosing the role of a strong female character fighting against a villain. She talked about the heightened fear she felt in a confined studio as her radio DJ character receives threatening phone calls from a kidnapper (played by Yoo Ji-tae), as well as the physical difficulty of filming chase and fight scenes in high heels. She tied with Yoon Jeong-hee (Poetry) for Best Actress at the Blue Dragon Film Awards.

In her return to television, Soo Ae played a cold-blooded double agent in Athena: Goddess of War, undergoing martial arts training to perform her intense action scenes in the spy series.

Then in the miniseries A Thousand Days' Promise by famed drama writer Kim Soo-hyun, Soo Ae impressed critics and audiences with her unsentimental portrayal of a woman who is slowly losing her memory due to Alzheimer's disease.

2013–present
In 2013, she played an amorally ambitious woman who wants to become the First Lady of South Korea in Yawang ("Queen of Ambition"), from the same manhwa artist as Daemul. This was followed by disaster outbreak film The Flu, in which she said she played a doctor and single mother who searches for a cure after her daughter is infected. Soo Ae said she is attracted to roles with an oeyunaegang quality, which literally translates to "iron fist in a velvet glove," meaning those who appear gentle but are determined and strong.

In September 2013, Soo Ae left Star J Entertainment, her agency of 12 years, and joined Management Soop. She returned to Star J Entertainment in January 2015. Soo Ae next played dual roles in Mask, about a debt-ridden department store clerk who takes on an heiress's identity and marries into a chaebol family. Her performance won her Best Actress at the 28th Grimae Award, an honorable award chosen by directors in every broadcasting station in Korea. She was then cast as a North Korean defector who becomes part of the first South Korean women's national ice hockey team in Take Off 2, the sequel to the 2009 hit sports drama.

Nine years after her last romantic-comedy drama Two Outs in the Ninth Inning, Soo Ae starred in KBS2's romantic-comedy Sweet Stranger and Me in 2016.

In 2018, Soo Ae starred in the drama film High Society.
In May 2019, Soo Ae signed with new agency Huayi Brothers.

In November 2022, Soo Ae signed with Ghost Studio.

Filmography

Film

Television series

Awards and nominations

References

External links 

21st-century South Korean actresses
20th-century South Korean actresses
Actresses from Seoul
South Korean film actresses
South Korean television actresses
Living people
People from Seoul
1979 births
Best New Actress Paeksang Arts Award (film) winners